Carl Hagen may refer to:

 Carl I. Hagen (born 1944), Norwegian politician
 Carl Fredrik Hagen (born 1991), Norwegian cyclist
 Carl Heinrich Hagen (1785–1856), jurist, socio-economist and government official
 C. R. Hagen (born 1937), professor of particle physics

See also 
 Karl Gottfried Hagen (1749–1829), German chemist